Run for Your Life is an American television drama television series starring Ben Gazzara as a man with only a short time to live. It ran on NBC from 1965 to 1968. The series was created by Roy Huggins, who had previously explored the "man on the move" concept with The Fugitive.

Synopsis

Premise
Ben Gazzara played attorney Paul Bryan. When his doctor tells him he will die in no less than 9 months, but in no more than 18 months, he decides to do all the things for which he had never had the time—to squeeze 10 years of living into one or two years of life. Much like Route 66, each episode features the main character on the move, encountering new people in new situations.

Background
Gazzara originated the character of Paul Bryan on Kraft Suspense Theatre, in the episode "Rapture at Two-Forty," which aired on April 15, 1965, and served as the show's pilot. Well received, the show became a series that September. Near the beginning of that episode, the audience actually sees the conversation between Bryan and his doctor, which is heard only in voice-over in subsequent episodes of Run For Your Life. Although Bryan's doctor gave him no more than 18 months to live, the series ran for three seasons, with 86 hour-long episodes, all filmed in color.

Episodes

Pilot (Kraft Suspense Theatre, 1965)
SOURCES

Season 1 (1965–66)
SOURCES

Season 2 (1966–67)
SOURCES

Season 3 (1967–68)

Production
Bryan needed to have a disease from which he would die, but would not affect his quality of life otherwise. The disease selected was chronic myelogenous leukemia.

References

External links
 
 The Ultimate Episode Guide to Run For Your Life With Ben Gazzara
 Run for Your Life opening and closing credits on YouTube
 Krat Suspense Theatre episode "Rapture at Two-Forty" (pilot for Run for Your Life) on YouTube
 Run for Your Life episode "The Girl Next Door Is a Spy" on YouTube
 Run for Your Life episode "Someone Who Makes Me Feel Beautiful" on YouTube

1965 American television series debuts
1968 American television series endings
1960s American drama television series
American television spin-offs
English-language television shows
NBC original programming
Television series by Universal Television
Television series created by Roy Huggins
Television series about lawyers